The Fieseler Fi 156 Storch ("stork") was a German liaison aircraft built by Fieseler before and during World War II. Production continued in other countries into the 1950s for the private market. It was notable for its excellent short field (STOL) performance and low stalling speed of 50 km/h (31 mph). French-built later variants often appear at air shows. Compared to most other liaison aircraft of the period, the Storch was quite large and heavy, with its wingspan exceeding 14 meters (nearly 47 feet) and its weight slightly over 1,300 kg (2,900 pounds) when fully loaded. It was significantly heavier, slower, and less agile than Allied liaison aircraft such as the American Piper L-4 or Stinson L-5, or the British Auster.

Design and development

Conception and production
In 1935, the RLM (Reichsluftfahrtministerium, Reich Aviation Ministry) invited several aviation companies to submit design proposals that would compete for the production contract for a new Luftwaffe aircraft design suitable for liaison, army co-operation (today called forward air control), and medical evacuation. This resulted in the Messerschmitt Bf 163 and Siebel Si 201 competing against the Fieseler firm's entry. Conceived by chief designer Reinhold Mewes and technical director Erich Bachem, Fieseler's design had a far better short take off and landing ("STOL") performance. A fixed slat ran along the entire length of the leading edge of the long wings, while a hinged and slotted set of control surfaces ran along the entire length of trailing edge. This was inspired by earlier 1930s Junkers Doppelflügel, "double-wing" aircraft wing control surface design concepts. For the Fi 156, this setup along each wing panel's trailing edge was split nearly 50/50 between the inboard-located flaps and outboard-located ailerons, which, in turn, included trim tab devices over half of each aileron's trailing edge length.

A design feature rare for land-based aircraft enabled the wings on the Storch to be folded back along the fuselage in a manner similar to the wings of the Royal Navy's Fairey Swordfish torpedo bomber. This allowed the aircraft to be carried on a trailer or even towed slowly behind a vehicle. The primary hinge for the folding wing was located in the wing root, where the rear wing spar met the cabin. The long legs of the main landing gear contained oil-and-spring shock absorbers that had a travel of 40 cm (15-3/4 inches), allowing the aircraft to land on comparatively rough and uneven surfaces; this was combined with a "pre-travel" distance of 20 cm, before the oleos began damping the landing gear shock. In flight, the main landing gear legs hung down, giving the aircraft the appearance of a long-legged, big-winged bird, hence its nickname, Storch. With its very low landing speed, the Storch often appeared to land vertically, or even backwards in strong winds from directly ahead.

Starting with the C-2 variant, the Fi 156 was fitted with a raised, fully-glazed position for a flexible rear-firing MG 15 7.92mm machine gun for self-defense.

German production
About 2,900 Fi 156s, mostly C variants, were produced from 1937 to 1945. Main production was at the Fieseler Factory in Kassel, in 1942 production started in the Morane-Saulnier factory at Puteaux in France. Due to the demand for Fieseler as a subcontractor for building the Fw 190, Fi 156 production was shifted to Leichtbau Budweis in Budweis by the end of 1943. Factories in other countries under German control manufactured aircraft, including Fi 156s, for Germany.

Soviet production
In 1939, after the signing of the Molotov–Ribbentrop Pact, Germany provided several aircraft, including the Fi 156C, to the Soviet Union. Oleg Antonov was made responsible for putting the aircraft into production to meet Soviet requirements, and given a choice between designing an equivalent aircraft or merely copying the German design, the latter was selected. The aircraft was titled OKA-38 and two versions were envisaged: the SS three seat liaison aircraft, and the N-2 air ambulance capable of carrying two stretchers plus a medic.  A prototype was constructed in Factory No. 365, established on the basis of Lithuanian Military Aviation Works, in Kaunas, recently occupied Lithuania. The first prototype  however was built in Factory No. 23 in Leningrad and flew before the end of 1940. The production in Kaunas has just started as the factory was lost to the German advance in 1941. While Antonov's efforts had produced a heavier aircraft, which required as much as three times the field for landing and take off as the German Fi 156C (160 m vs 55 m), it also had much greater range and increased load capability. After the war Antonov went on to design the legendary An-2 STOL biplane, which also had excellent STOL performance.

Production in Czechoslovakia
In 1944 production was moved from the Leichtbau Budweis to the Mráz factory in Choceň which produced 138 examples of the Fi 156, locally designated as "K-65 Čáp". Production ended in 1949.

Production in France

During World War II, Morane-Saulnier was operated under German control and built a number of German types including the Fieseler Storch. Immediately after the liberation of France in 1944, the production of Fi 156 at the Morane-Saulnier factory was continued at the request of the Armée de l'Air, designated MS 500 Criquet for the batch of aircraft produced with the remaining stock of Argus air-cooled inverted V8 engines. Aircraft with further modifications and  different engines (inline and radial) are known under different type numbers. The use of the aircraft in Indochina highlighted the weakness of wood for the construction of the airframe; it was then decided to build the wings of metal. Among the modifications, the defensive weapon aiming through the back window was dropped, although some aircraft were modified in the field to take a MAC 34T machine gun firing through one of the side windows. Some 141 aircraft were built before the end of World War II, and a total of 925 aircraft were built before the end of the production of all types of Criquet by Morane-Saulnier in 1965.

Production in Romania
Licence production was started in Romania in October 1943 at the ICAR factory in Bucharest. Only 10 were built by the time the ICAR factory was bombed in May 1944. Production resumed later in 1944, but only six were completed before repair work halted production. From June 1945 until 1946, a further 64 aircraft were built.

Summary of production
Production per factory and per type until 31 March 1945:

Modern development

Because of its superb STOL characteristics, there have been many attempts to recreate or copy the Storch, mainly in the form of various three-quarter scale homebuilt aircraft, such as the Pazmany PL-9 Stork, Roger Mann's RagWing RW19 Stork, and Preceptors STOL King. 

As an example, the Slepcev Storch is a three-quarter scale reproduction of the original with some simplifications. The use of modern materials provides better STOL performance than the original with a take-off run of 30 m and landing-roll of 50 m with no headwind. It was originally designed and manufactured in Australia and is now manufactured in Serbia.

Operational history

During World War II

The Storch was deployed in all European and North African theaters of World War II. In addition to its liaison function, a number were used to fly a battalion of Infantry Regiment Grossdeutschland behind enemy lines during the invasion of Belgium.

Field Marshal Rommel used Storch aircraft for transport and battlefield surveillance during the North African desert campaign of World War II.

In 1943, the Storch played a role in Operation Eiche, the rescue of deposed Italian dictator Benito Mussolini from a boulder-strewn mountain-top near the Gran Sasso. Even though the mountain was surrounded by Italian troops, German commando Otto Skorzeny and 90 paratroopers used gliders to land on the peak and quickly captured it. However, the problem of how to get back off remained. A Focke-Achgelis Fa 223 helicopter was sent, but it broke down en route. Instead, pilot Heinrich Gerlach flew in a Storch. It landed in 30 m (100 ft), and after Mussolini and Skorzeny boarded, it took off in 80 m (250 ft), even though the aircraft was overloaded. The Storch involved in rescuing Mussolini bore the radio code letters, or Stammkennzeichen, of "SJ + LL" in the motion picture coverage of the daring rescue.

On 26 April 1945, a Storch was one of the last aircraft to land on the improvised airstrip in the Tiergarten near the Brandenburg Gate during the Battle of Berlin and the death throes of Nazi Germany. It was flown by the test pilot Hanna Reitsch, who flew Generalfeldmarschall Robert Ritter von Greim from Munich to Berlin to answer a summons from Hitler.

A Storch was the last aircraft shot down by the Allies on the Western Front and another was downed by a direct Allied counterpart of the Storch, an L-4 Grasshopper, the military version of the well-known American Piper J-3 Cub civilian training and sport aircraft. The pilot and co-pilot of the L-4, lieutenants Duane Francis and Bill Martin, opened fire on the Storch with their .45 caliber pistols, forcing the German air crew to land and surrender.

During the war a number of Störche were captured by the Allies. One became the personal aircraft of Field Marshal Montgomery. Others were used as the personal aircraft of Air Vice Marshal Arthur Coningham and Air Vice Marshal Harry Broadhurst, who acquired his Storch in North Africa, and flew it subsequently in Italy and North-West Europe.

The British captured 145, of which 64 were given to the French as war compensation from Germany.

Post-World War II

The French Air Force (Armée de l'Air) and the French Army Light Aviation (Aviation Légère de l’Armée de Terre) used the Criquet from 1945 to 1958 throughout the Indochina War and the Algerian War. The Swiss Air Force and other mountainous European countries continued to use the Storch for rescues in terrain where STOL performance was necessary, as with the historically significant Gauli Glacier crash rescue in November 1946, as a pair of Flugwaffe-flown Storches were the sole means to get its twelve survivors to safety. After World War II, Storch aircraft were used in utility roles including agricultural spraying. Many Storches are still operational today and are commonly shown at air shows. In North America, both the Collings Foundation and the Fantasy of Flight museum have airworthy Fi 156 Storch aircraft in their collections.

Variants
 Fi 156 V1: Prototype equipped with an adjustable metal propeller, registration D-IKVN (produced in 1935–1936)
 Fi 156 V2: Prototype equipped with a wooden propeller. First prototype to fly (May 10, 1936). registration D-IDVS (produced in 1935–1936)
 Fi 156 V3: Prototype identical to the V2. Test machine for various radio equipment, registration D-IGLI (produced in 1936)
 Fi 156 V4: Prototype identical to the V3. Skis for landing gear and disposable auxiliary tank. (produced in 1936–1937)
 Fi 156 V5: Production prototype for A-series. (produced in 1937)
 Fi 156 A-0: Pre-production aircraft, identical to the V3. Ten aircraft were produced. (produced in 1937–1938)
 Fi 156 A-1: First production models for service, ordered into production by the Luftwaffe with an order for 16 aircraft, the first production aircraft entered service in mid-1937. Some sources cite that only six were effectively produced. (produced in 1938)
 Fi 156 B: Fitted with a new system which could retract the normally fixed leading edge slats and had a number of minor aerodynamic cleanups, boosting the speed to 208 km/h (130 mph). The Luftwaffe did not consider such a small difference to be important and the Fi-156 B was not produced.
 Fi 156 C-0: Pre-production. Essentially a "flexible" version of the A model. (produced in 1939)
 Fi 156 C-1: Three-seat liaison version. (produced in 1939–1940)
 Fi 156 C-2: Two-seat observation type, which had a raised, fully glazed rear dorsal gun position for mounting a MG 15 machine gun for defense. (produced in 1940)
 Fi 156 C-3: Replaced the C-1 and C-2 with a "universal cockpit" suited for any role. (produced in 1940–1941)
 Fi 156 C-3/Trop: Version adapted for tropical and desert conditions. Filtered intakes. (produced in 1940–1942)
 Fi 156 C-5: Addition of a belly hardpoint for a camera pod or jettisionable auxiliary tanks. Some were fitted with skis, rather than wheels, for operation on snow. (produced in 1941–1945)
 Fi 156 C-5/Trop: Version adapted for tropical and desert conditions. Filtered intakes. (produced in 1941–1945)
 Fi 156 C-7: Three-seat liaison version. "Flat" cockpit glazing similar to the C-1. 
 Fi 156 D-0: Pre-production version of the air ambulance version of the C model with a larger cockpit and extra rear fuselage-location starboard-side door for stretcher accommodation. Powered by an Argus As 10P engine. (produced in 1941)
 Fi 156 D-1: Production version of the D-0. (produced in 1942–1945)
 Fi 156 E-0: Liaison version identical to the C-1; 10 pre-production aircraft were fitted with tracked landing gear and were produced in 1941–1942.
 Fi 156 F or P: Counter insurgency version. Identical to the C-3 with machine guns in side windows and bomb-racks and smoke layers. (produced in 1942)
 Fi 156 U: Anti-submarine version. Identical to the C-3 with depth charge. (produced in 1940)
 Fi 156 K-1: Export version of the C-1 (Bought by Sweden).
 Fi 256: A five-seat civil version; two were built by Morane-Saulnier.
 MS.500: Liaison version. French produced with 240 hp French built Argus engine, as the Fi 156 had used.
 MS.501: With a 233 hp Renault 6Q inverted, air-cooled "straight six" engine instead of the Argus inverted V8.
 MS.502: Liaison version. Identical to the MS-500, with the Argus engine replaced by a 230 hp Salmson 9ab radial engine.
 MS.504: with a 304 hp Jacobs R-755-A2 radial engine.
 MS.505: Observation version of the MS-500 with the Argus engine replaced by a 304 hp Jacobs R-755-A2 radial engine.
 MS.506: with a 235 hp Lycoming engine.
 Mráz K-65 Čáp: Production in Czechoslovakia after World War II.
 Antonov OKA-38 Aist ("stork" in Russian): An unlicensed Soviet copy of the Fi 156, powered by a copy of a Renault MV-6 inverted, air-cooled straight-six engine (similar to the Renault 6Q), was starting production as the factory was overrun by German forces in 1941

Operators

 Bulgarian Air Force
 Royal Khmer Aviation - AVRK (Post war) and Khmer Air Force (KAF)
 Air Force of the Independent State of Croatia

 Czechoslovakian Air Force (Post war)
 Police aviation (cs) (Post war)
 Egyptian Air Force
 Finnish Air Force

 French Air Force (Post war)
 French Navy (Post war)
 French Army (Post war)
 Luftwaffe
 Royal Air Force
 Royal Hellenic Air Force (Post war)
 Royal Hungarian Air Force
 Regia Aeronautica
 Royal Lao Air Force (Post war)

 Royal Moroccan Air Force (Post war)
 Royal Norwegian Air Force (Post war)

 Polish Air Force (Post war)
 Polish Navy (Post war)

 Royal Romanian Air Force
 Romanian Air Force (Post war)
 Slovak Air Force (1939–1945)
 Republic of Vietnam Air Force (Post war)
 Soviet Air Force
 Spanish Air Force
 Swedish Air Force
 Swiss Air Force
 Yugoslav Royal Air Force
 SFR Yugoslav Air Force

Surviving aircraft

Argentina 

  MS.502 Criquet at the Museo Nacional de Aeronáutica, at Morón, Buenos Aires.

Austria

 110253 – Fi 156 on static display at the Museum of Military History in Vienna, Austria.

Belgium
 5503 – S-14B on static display at the Royal Museum of the Armed Forces and Military History in Brussels, Brussels.

Finland
 4230/39 – Fi 156 K-1 on display at the Finnish Aviation Museum in Vantaa, Uusimaa. It is the only surviving Finnish Air Force Storch. It retains its civilian paint scheme and registration, OH-FSA, from its final owner. It previously carried the serial number ST-112 and the registration OH-VSF.

Germany

 73 – MS.505 airworthy at the Fliegendes Museum in Großenhain, Saxony. It is registered as D-EGTY and is painted in French Air Force colors.
 637 – MS.500 on static display at the Luftwaffenmuseum der Bundeswehr in Berlin, Berlin.
 4299 – Fi 156 C-3 on static display at the Deutsches Museum in Munich, Bavaria.
 110062 – Fi 156 C-3 on static display at the Deutsches Technikmuseum in Berlin, Berlin.
 110254 – S-14 on static display at the Technik Museum Speyer in Speyer, Rhineland-Palatinate.
 Composite – Fi 156 C-3 airworthy at the Deutsches Museum Flugwerft Schleissheim in Munich, Bavaria.

Italy
 MM12822 – Fi 156 C-3 on display at Italian Air Force Museum in Bracciano, Lazio.

Norway
 43 – MS.500 airworthy in Fetsund, Akershus. It has been restored as a Fi 156 C-3.
 Composite – MS.500 on display at the Sola Aviation Museum in Stavanger, Rogaland. It has been converted to resemble a Fi 156 C-2 during restoration.

Serbia

 c/n 91 – Mráz K-65 Čáp on static display at the Belgrade Aviation Museum in Surčin, Belgrade. It was converted to a medical transport and has the registration YU-COE.

South Africa
 475099 – Fi 156 C-7 airworthy at the South African Air Force Museum at Air Force Base Swartkop in Centurion, Gauteng. It is painted in the Luftwaffe markings VT+TD. It was acquired by the South African Air Force in 1946.

Spain
 Composite – Fi 156 C-3 on display at the Museo del Aire in Madrid.

Switzerland
 1685 – Fi 156C 3 on static display at the Flieger-Flab-Museum in Dubendorf, Zurich.
 8063 – Fi 156C 3/Trop on static display at the Swiss Museum of Transport in Lucerne, Lucerne.

United Kingdom
 475081 – Fi 156 C-7 on static display at the Royal Air Force Museum Cosford in Cosford, Shropshire.

United States

 381 – MS.502 on static display at the Planes of Fame Air Museum in Chino, California.
 724 – MS.500 on static display at the Pima Air & Space Museum in Tucson, Arizona.
 728 – MS.502 airworthy at the War Eagles Air Museum in Santa Teresa, New Mexico.
 3808 – Fi 156 C-1 on static display at the National Museum of the United States Air Force in Dayton, Ohio. It was built in 1940.
 4362 – Fi 156 C-2 airworthy at the Flying Heritage Collection in Everett, Washington.
 4621 – MS.500 airworthy with the Collings Foundation in Stow, Massachusetts. bearing the Geschwaderkennung "B1+BB" of a Luftwaffe "flight-readiness" support unit.
 4642 – Fi 156 C-2 airworthy at the Fantasy of Flight museum in Polk City, Florida.
 Unknown ID – MS.500 in storage at the Paul E. Garber Preservation, Restoration, and Storage Facility of the National Air and Space Museum in Suitland, Maryland.

Specifications (Fi 156C-2)

See also

References

Notes

Bibliography
 Axworthy Mark. "On Three Fronts: Romania's Aircraft Industry During World War Two." Air Enthusiast No.56, pp. 8–27. Stamford: Key Publishing, 1994. ISSN 0143-5450.
 Axworthy Mark, Cornel Scafes and Cristian Craciunoiu. Third Axis Fourth Ally: Romanian Armed Forces in the European War, 1941–1945. London: Arms & Armour Press, 1995. .
 Bateson, Richard. Fieseler Fi 156 Storch Aircraft Profile No. 228. Windsor, Berkshire, UK: Profile Publications Ltd., 1971. ASIN: B000J443X2.
 Beevor, Antony. Berlin: The Downfall 1945. London: Penguin Books, 2002. .
 Green, William. The Warplanes of the Third Reich. Garden City, New York: Doubleday and Company, Inc., 1970. .
 Karnas, Dariusz and Pawel Przymusiala. Fi 156 Storch Vol.1 (Militaria n.68). Warsaw: Wydawnictwo, 1998. .
 Karnas, Dariusz and Pawel Przymusiala. Fi 156 Storch Vol.2 (Militaria n.100) Warsaw: Wydawnictwo, 1999. .

 Mesko, Jim. "The Rise...and Fall of the Vietnamese AF". Air Enthusiast, August–November 1981, No. 16. pp. 1–12, 78–80. .
 Ricco, Philippe and Jean-Claude Soumille. Les Avions Allemands aux Couleurs Francaises, Tome 1. Rochemaure, France: Airdoc, 1997. .
 Soumille, Jean-Claude. L'Aviation Francaise en Indochine 1946–1954, Tome 2. Rochemaure: Airdoc, 1997.
 Winchester Jim. Aircraft of World War II. San Diego, California: Thunder Bay Press, 2004. .

Other sources

External links

 Fliegendes Museum
 a restored Storch – the Fi 156 Storch C3 of the Brussels Air Museum Restoration Society 
 Swiss air rescue operation 1946
 The Collings Foundation's MS 500 Reenactment of a Luftwaffe flight-readiness unit's takeoff video

1930s German military utility aircraft
High-wing aircraft
Single-engined tractor aircraft
STOL aircraft
World War II utility aircraft of Germany
Fi 156
Aircraft first flown in 1936
World War II aircraft of Finland